Peridictyon is a name that has been used for a genus of grass with a single species, Peridictyon sanctum nom. inval., native to southern Bulgaria and northern Greece, but a technical problem with the publication means that it is not a botanical name.

Botanical nomenclature 
When the genus name Peridictyon was published, the authors cited the type as the combinatio nova P. sancta (Janka) Seberg, Fred. & Baden, based on Festuca sancta Janka. What they did not notice, however, is that the description provided in the publication of F. sancta Janka includes remarks about finding the species, but does not list any features of the plant that would distinguish it from other species in the genus Festuca as is required by the International Code of Nomenclature for algae, fungi, and plants. This oversight has been judged by Index Nominum Genericorum to mean that Peridictyon (and P. sanctum) are not validly published.

See also
List of Balkan endemic plants

References

Pooideae
Monotypic Poaceae genera